The 68th annual Berlin International Film Festival took place from 15 to 25 February 2018. German filmmaker Tom Tykwer served as Jury President. American film director Wes Anderson's animated film Isle of Dogs opened the festival, becoming first animated film to open the fest.  The Romanian film Touch Me Not directed by Adina Pintilie won the Golden Bear, which also served as the closing night film.

Jury

Main Competition
The following people were named for the jury for the Berlinale Competition section:

International jury
 Tom Tykwer, film director, screenwriter, producer and composer (Germany) - Jury President
 Cécile de France, actress (Belgium)
 Chema Prado, journalist and film critic (Spain)
 Adele Romanski, film producer (United States)
 Ryuichi Sakamoto, musician and composer (Japan)
 Stephanie Zacharek, journalist and film critic (United States)

Best First Feature Award Jury
The following people were on the jury for the Best First Feature Award:
 Jonas Carpignano, director and screenwriter (Italy)
 Peter Călin Netzer, director, screenwriter and producer (Romania)
 Noa Regev, director of the Jerusalem Cinematheque and the Jerusalem Film Festival (Israel)

Documentary Award Jury
The following people were on the jury for the Berlinale Documentary film award:
 Cíntia Gil, curator of international festivals and events (Portugal)
 Ulrike Ottinger, filmmaker and photographer (Germany)
 Eric Schlosser, journalist and writer (United States)

International Short Film Jury
The following people were on the jury for the Berlinale Shorts section:
 Diogo Costa Amarante, director and director of photography (Portugal) 
 Jyoti Mistry, director and teacher at the Wits School of Arts in Johannesburg (South Africa)
 Mark Toscano, curator of international festivals and events (United States)

In competition
The following films were selected for the main competition for the Golden Bear and Silver Bear awards:

Out of competition
The following films were selected to be screened out of competition:

Panorama
The following films were selected for the Panorama section:

Panorama Dokumente
The following films were selected for the Panorama Dokumente section:

Awards
 

The following prizes were awarded:

 Golden Bear – Touch Me Not by Adina Pintilie
 Silver Bear Grand Jury Prize – Mug by Małgorzata Szumowska
 Alfred Bauer Prize (Silver Bear) – The Heiresses by Marcelo Martinessi
 Silver Bear for Best Director – Wes Anderson for Isle of Dogs
 Silver Bear for Best Actress – Ana Brun for The Heiresses
 Silver Bear for Best Actor – Anthony Bajon for The Prayer
 Silver Bear for Best Script – Alonso Ruizpalacios and Manuel Alcalá for Museum
 Silver Bear for Outstanding Artistic Contribution – Elena Okopnaya for costume and production design in Dovlatov
 Golden Bear for Best Short Film – The Men Behind the Wall by Ines Moldavsky
 Prize of the Ecumenical Jury – In the Aisles by Thomas Stuber
 GWFF Best First Feature Award (50.000 €) – Touch Me Not by Adina Pintilie
 Crystal Bear for Best Short Film, Generation KPlus Section – A Field Guide to Being a 12-Year-Old Girl by Tilda Cobham-Hervey.

References

External links

Berlin International Film Festival

2018 film festivals
2018 in Berlin
68
February 2018 events in Germany
2018 festivals in Europe
2018 in German cinema